William Alexander McLennan (10 April 1903 – 28 December 1980) was a Progressive Conservative party member of the House of Commons of Canada. Born in Paisley, Ontario, he was a lumber merchant by career.

He was first elected at the New Westminster riding in the 1958 general election. He served one term, the 24th Canadian Parliament, until his defeat at New Westminster in the 1962 federal election. He was defeated again on another attempt in the 1963 election.

References

External links
 

1903 births
1980 deaths
Members of the House of Commons of Canada from British Columbia
Progressive Conservative Party of Canada MPs
People from Bruce County